Zweig (German for "twig" or "branch") is the surname of:

 Alan Zweig, Canadian documentary filmmaker
Ann Strickler Zweig, American scientist
 Arnold Zweig (1887–1968), German writer and pacifist
 Esther Zweig (1906-1981), American author, composer and translator
 George Zweig (born 1937), American particle physicist and neurobiologist
 Martin Zweig (1942–2013), American stock investor and financial analyst
 Stefan Zweig (1881–1942), Austrian writer
 Stefan Jerzy Zweig (born 1941) Austrian (formerly Polish) author and camera operator, Holocaust survivor
 Stefanie Zweig (1932–2014), German writer
 Rabbi Yochanan Zweig (born 1942), American Rosh Yeshiva
 Zachi Zweig, birth name of Zachi Dvira, Israeli archaeologist

See also

German-language surnames
Jewish surnames
Yiddish-language surnames